Moscow Сalling (titled Gorky Park 2 in many countries, including Russia) is the second album by Russian rock band Gorky Park. It was released between 1992 and 1993. Four music videos were made for the album: "Moscow Calling", "Stranger", "I’m Going Down" and "Tell Me Why".

Reception 
After Nikolai Noskov left the band in 1990, bassist Alexander Minkov took over as lead vocalist. AllMusic's Jason Anderson notes his "faux Joe Elliot vocals" and overall finds the album "at times extremely reminiscent of Pyromania-era Def Leppard".

The album went completely unnoticed in the U.S., where the band's MTV hit "Bang" was long forgotten by most rock enthusiasts and the taste of the audience had changed, but was well received in other countries. It sold 500,000 copies outside the United States, notably becoming Platinum in Denmark.

Track listing

Personnel 

 Band members
 Alexandre "Big Sasha" Minkov — lead vocals, bass guitar
 Alexei Belov — guitar, keyboards, backing vocals
 Alexandre "Jan" Janenkov (Alexander "Yan" Yanenkov) — guitar
 Alexandre "Little Sasha" Lvov — drums

Additional musicians
 Richard Marx — backing vocals on "Two Candles"
 Steve Lukather — guitar solo on "Don't Pull the Trigger"
 Scott Page — saxophone on "Tomorrow"
 Steve Farris — guitar solo on "Strike"
 Fee Waybill — backing vocals on multiple songs
 Dweezil Zappa — additional guitar

Release dates

"Moscow Calling" (single) 

"Moscow Calling" is a song by the Russian rock band Gorky Park, released in 1992 as the lead single from the band's second album Moscow Calling.

Track listings

Selected release dates

References 

Gorky Park (band) albums
1992 albums
1993 albums